HMS Brilliant was a Type 22 frigate of the Royal Navy.

Brilliant took part in the only ship-to-ship engagement of the Falklands War, when she and  chased the Argentine coaster Monsunen, in the Battle of Seal Cove.

Royal Navy service

Falklands War
Brilliant was part of the task force that took part in the Falklands War, with Captain John Coward in command.

During the war, her two helicopters were involved in successfully attacking the Argentine submarine Santa Fe, and she was the first Royal Navy warship to fire the Sea Wolf missile in action when, on 12 May 1982, she shot down three A-4 Skyhawks.

On 21 May 1982 HMS Brilliant came under Argentine air attack outside San Carlos Water and was slightly damaged by cannon fire. On 23 May she joined HMS Yarmouth in the chase of the Argentinian supply ship ARA Monsunen.

She rescued 24 survivors from Atlantic Conveyor on 25 May. Brilliant had sailed south with a pair of WE.177A nuclear depth charges on board.

1983–1996
In 1987 she became leader of the 2nd Frigate Squadron. On 14 May 1989, the ship's helicopter, a Lynx HAS3, XZ244, crashed near Mombasa, Kenya, while en route to the city's airport for a period of shore leave. A door had detached when opened inflight and collided with the tail rotor, resulting in the aircraft splitting in half and the death of all nine personnel on board.

In October 1990 she saw the first members of the Women's Royal Naval Service to serve officially on an operational warship. In January 1991, Brilliant deployed to the Persian Gulf as part of the Operation Granby Task Force, in the First Gulf War. Brilliant starred in a BBC documentary series called HMS Brilliant – In a Ship's Company by the journalist Chris Terrill in 1994, while she was undertaking an operational tour off the coast of former Yugoslavia enforcing a United Nations arms embargo in the Adriatic sea.

Brazilian Navy service
She was decommissioned from Royal Navy service in 1996 and sold to the Brazilian Navy on 31 August 1996 and renamed Dodsworth.

F47 Dodsworth was sold for scrap and broken up at Aliağa, Turkey, during July 2012.

The silhouette of HMS Brilliant is painted, with the date 21 May, on the side of Argentine Air Force IAI Finger serial number C-412. Also painted on C-412 is the silhouette of HMS Arrow and the date 1 May. These kill markings (without crossing) have to do with damage to both ships in the Falklands War, HMS Arrow being slightly damaged by cannon fire 1 May 1982 and HMS Brilliant also being slightly damaged by cannon fire on 21 May. C-412's markings were painted soon after the war; they were seen during the November 2005 multi-national Exercise Ceibo in Argentina.

Commanding officers

References

Notes

Bibliography

 
 
 AirForces Monthly Magazine February 2006, page 61.

External links
 Argentine Aircraft Successes against British Ships
 F47 Dodsworth 

 

Falklands War naval ships of the United Kingdom
1978 ships
Type 22 frigates of the Royal Navy
Type 22 frigates of the Brazilian Navy